Southwoods Mall is a lifestyle mall development under Megaworld Lifestyle Malls  located inside the 561-hectare Southwood City township of Megaworld Corporation in Biñan, Laguna.

Features
The three-level mall offers 58,000 square meters of shopping, dining, entertainment and leisure. Southwoods Mall features a 24-hour Food Hall, four state-of-the-art cinemas, a department store, supermarket, hardware store, toy store and its own transport hub. The mall is also directly connected to office towers catering to BPO companies and home to more than 10,000 employees.

Southwoods Mall is also known for its open spaces and alfresco areas with gardens and greeneries

Gallery

See also
 Eastwood City
 Evia Lifestyle Center

References

External links 
 

Shopping malls in the Philippines